Charles Utting (12 March 1923 – 11 October 2009) was an Australian rules footballer who debuted for Collingwood at the age of 20 in 1943. His career goal total was 17 from 125 games over 8 seasons. He was vice-captain and won the Copeland Trophy in 1950, his final season as he retired at only 27 years of age because of his involvement in his family's business.

Utting went on to coach the Collingwood Seconds from 1951 to 1953, was a member of the committee from 1968 to 1975, and was a Collingwood life member. He was also the nephew of Ern Utting who played for Collingwood and Hawthorn.

He was mayor of the City of Collingwood in 1976–77.

References
Collingwood Football Club news 2009

External links

Collingwood Forever profile

Collingwood Football Club players
Copeland Trophy winners
Australian rules footballers from Victoria (Australia)
1923 births
2009 deaths